Gnaeus Calpurnius Piso (c. 44/43 BCAD 20), was a Roman statesman during the reigns of Augustus and Tiberius. He served as consul in 7 BC, after which he was appointed governor of Hispania and consul of Africa. He belonged to one of Rome's most distinguished senatorial families, whose members included Calpurnia, third wife of Julius Caesar.

Family
He was a member of the gens Calpurnia, specifically among the Calpurnii Pisones. His father and grandfather both shared his name, with his father being Gnaeus Calpurnius Piso (consul in 23 BC), and his grandfather being one of the participants in the Catiline Conspiracy. He had a brother, Lucius Calpurnius Piso, who was an augur and became consul in 1 BC.

Piso was married to Plancina, a woman of noble rank and wealth. By Plancina, Piso had two sons, Gnaeus Calpurnius Piso, who after Piso's death had to take the name of Lucius Calpurnius Piso (consul in AD 27), and Marcus Calpurnius Piso.

Career
Piso held several positions under Augustus and Tiberius. Ronald Syme infers that Piso was a military tribune in the Spanish campaigns of 26–25 BC. This accords with his known tenure as triumvir monetalis in 23 BC. Between that office and being appointed quaestor, which enabled him entry into the Roman Senate, Syme infers Piso was married. Syme fills the gap between those events and his consulate with various activities, such as accompanying his friend Claudius Nero in his Alpine campaign. At some date between 5 BC and AD 2 he was admitted to the College of Pontiffs.

In 3 BC he was proconsul of the province of Africa, and of Hispania Tarraconensis in AD 9.
 According to Tacitus, he was cruel to the people of Spain, but during his trial in AD 20 such claims were discounted as "old and irrelevant".

Though he was given many appointments throughout his career, Piso was known to have a temper. In AD 16, he argued against Tiberius that the senate should be able to conduct business without the emperor if the emperor was away from Rome. It was only after a lengthy debate between Piso and senators close to Tiberius that he lost the debate.

Governorship of Syria

In AD 17, heir designate Germanicus was given command of the eastern portion of the empire and Piso was appointed as his legate, and made governor of Syria. This appointment came with the command of four legions. Though both Piso and Germanicus were of the same rank, Germanicus had greater authority (imperium maius). Tacitus suggests that Piso was appointed to act as a check on Germanicus, and that he was given secret instructions by Tiberius to thwart his efforts and control him.

In the summer of 19, Germanicus had left to take care of matters in Egypt, and when he returned he found that Piso had ignored his orders to the cities and the legions. Germanicus was furious and ordered Piso's recall to Rome. During the feud, Germanicus fell ill and, though Piso had left the province, Germanicus claimed Piso had poisoned him. Piso received a letter from Germanicus renouncing their friendship (amicitia). On 10 October, Germanicus died from the illness. Upon hearing of Germanicus' death, he returned to resume command of Syria.

Trial
As the death of Germanicus occurred during their feud most people suspected him of having poisoned Germanicus, although this was never proven. The armed attempt by Piso to regain control of Syria immediately after the death of Germanicus only aroused more indignation. This, the rumors of him poisoning Germanicus, and his conduct going back as far as his governorship of Spain were all taken up by the delatores in their accusations against him. It wasn't long before the matter was taken to the Emperor.

Tiberius was forced to order an investigation, and after briefly hearing both sides, decided to defer the case to the senate. Tiberius made no effort to conceal his sentiments: the Pisones were longtime supporters of the Claudians, with their support going back to the early days of Octavian. A public trial was held, and Tiberius made allowances for Piso to summon witnesses of all social orders, including slaves, and he was given more time to plea than the prosecution, but it made no difference: before the sentencing, Piso had died. He committed suicide, though Tacitus supposes that Tiberius may have had him murdered, fearing his own implication in Germanicus' death.

The accusations brought against Piso are numerous, including:

Insubordination 
Corruption 
Abandoning and reentering a province 
Summary justice 
Destroying military discipline 
Misusing the fiscus principis (emperor's money) 
Fomenting civil war 
Violating the divinity of Divus Augustus (sacrilege).

Although the murder of Germanicus was one of the accusations brought against him, he was only actually found guilty of abandoning and reentering Syria without authorisation to wage war, and for violating Germanicus' imperium, for, although they were both of proconsular rank, his authority was less than that of Germanicus, to whom the senate had given greater authority (imperium maius) in the eastern provinces before his departure in AD 17.

In accordance with the lex Iulia maiestatis, the senate had his property proscribed, forbade mourning on his account, removed images of his likeness, such as statues and portraits, and his name was erased from the base of one statue in particular as part of his damnatio memoriae. Additionally, the senate instructed the curatores locorum publicorum iudicandorum to remove and destroy structures built above Porta Fontinalis to connect his properties. Yet, in a show of clemency not unlike that of the emperor, the senate had Piso's property returned and divided equally between his two sons, on condition that his daughter Calpurnia be given 1,000,000 sesterces as dowry and a further 4,000,000 as personal property. His wife Plancina was absolved. Allegedly Munatia Plancina was convicted of very serious crimes. But her powerful friend Livia fought for her and exerted pressure on Tiberius. Therefore, her acquittal was foreseeable and she dissociated herself from her husband Piso who committed suicide. A recently discovered senate resolution also confirms that Munatia Plancina owed her impunity to the recommendation of Tiberius, who had been pressed by Livia to act in this way. But after the death of Livia in 29 AD, Plancina no longer had such a powerful protectress. So in 33 AD Tiberius renewed the charge. Plancina committed suicide before the judgement.

His accomplices, a Visellius Karus and a Sempronius Bassus, were to be declared outlaws for committing treason. Their property was to be sold with profits consigned to the aerarium. It is unclear whether or not their case was handled by a judicial authority, such as a quaestio, or by the senate as well.

Character
Piso was a man of violent temper, without an idea of obedience, and a natural arrogance. He saw himself as superior to the children of Tiberius. Piso's marriage to Plancina, a woman of noble rank and wealth, only inflamed his ambition.

Seneca, in On Anger, tells about a legionary who returned from a foraging mission without his partner and unable to explain where his friend was. Piso, suspecting murder, accused the legionary and sentenced him to death without offering him time to search for the missing soldier. The centurion at the time was given the order to behead the accused. Fortunately for the legionary, before the centurion could swing the sword, the missing soldier walked into the camp and the execution was stopped. All three men went to Gnaeus Piso to show that the legionary had returned.
To this Piso ordered all three men to be beheaded: the first because he lost his friend; the centurion because he failed to obey his orders; and the third for getting lost. Wrath had found a way to think up three crimes where there was none.

Piso in fiction
He was played by John Phillips in the ITV series The Caesars, and by Stratford Johns in the BBC TV serial I, Claudius.

Footnotes

References

Bibliography

Primary sources
 Suetonius, Lives of the Twelve Caesars, Life of Caligula, Latin text with English translation
 Suetonius, Lives of the Twelve Caesars, Life of Tiberius, Latin text with English translation
 Tacitus, Annals, I–III, English translation
 Senatus Consultum de Pisone ("The Senate's decree against Gnaeus Piso senior")
 Seneca the Younger, de Ira I, XVIII, 3–4

Secondary sources

External links
 Calpurnius Piso entry in historical sourcebook by Mahlon H. Smith
 Senatus Consultum de Cn. Pisone patre – recently discovered decree of the senate summarizing the results of Piso's trial (in Latin)

40s BC births
Year of birth uncertain
20 deaths
1st-century Roman governors of Syria
Imperial Roman consuls
Calpurnii Pisones
Ancient Romans who committed suicide
1st-century BC Romans
1st-century Romans
Roman governors of Hispania Tarraconensis
Roman governors of Syria
Augurs of the Roman Empire
Roman governors of Africa